Tamil Nadu State Highway 60 (SH-60) connects Hogenakkal with Tirupattur.

Route
The total length of SH-60 is 108.2 km.

Junctions
SH-60 Route: Hogenakkal - Pennagaram - Dharmapuri - Pochampalli - Mathur - Tirupattur

See also 
 Highways of Tamil Nadu

References

External links
  Hogenakkal to Tirupattur Road
  State Highways of Tamilnadu

State highways in Tamil Nadu